Saint Aldate (died 577) was a bishop of Gloucester, venerated as a saint with the feast day of 4 February. Aldate's life is not detailed historically, but he was probably a Briton killed by the Anglo-Saxons at Deorham. He is reported to have roused the countryside to resist pagan invasion forces. He is mentioned in the Sarum and other martyrologies; his feast occurs in a Gloucester calendar (14th-century addition); churches were dedicated to him at Gloucester and Oxford, as well as a famous Oxford street: St Aldate's, Oxford and a minor street in Gloucester. But nothing seems to be known of him: it was even suggested that his name was a corruption of "old gate".

References 
 Baring-Gould and Fisher, ii. 426–8; Early British Kingdoms after 1100, ii. 40

Southwestern Brythonic saints
577 deaths
Year of birth unknown